Tünkhel  is an urban-type settlement in the Mandal sum (district) of Selenge Province in northern Mongolia. It is 35 km SE from Züünkharaa city or 45 km along the railway. Tünkhel has a station on the Trans-Mongolian Railway. Gatsuurt gold mine is 15 km W from Tünkhel.

Populated places in Mongolia